was a Japanese writer prominent in the postwar era. He is most readily associated with other writers of his generation, such as Shōtarō Yasuoka, who describe the effects of Japan's defeat in World War II on the country's psyche.

From an early age, Kojima read a wide variety of literature, both Japanese and Western, and such writers as Nikolai Gogol, Franz Kafka, and Fyodor Dostoevsky had a strong influence on his work. In addition to his fiction, he had a long career as a professor of English literature at Meiji University in Tokyo, publishing criticism and making translations of many major American writers, including Dorothy Parker, Irwin Shaw, and Bernard Malamud.

Selected works

Awards
 1954 Akutagawa Prize – American School (Amerikan sukūru 「アメリカン・スクール」)
 1970 Tanizaki Prize – Embracing Family (Hōyō kazoku, 「抱擁家族」)

Further reading
"The Rifle," translated by Lawrence Rogers in The Oxford Book of Japanese Short Stories, Theodore W. Gossen, (ed.), Oxford, 1997.

Notes

External links
 http://homepage1.nifty.com/naokiaward/akutagawa/jugun/jugun32KN.htm
 http://www7.ocn.ne.jp/~n-kojima/page/3rd.html
 Nobuo Kojima at J'Lit Books from Japan 
 Synopsis of Embracing Family at JLPP (Japanese Literature Publishing Project) 

1915 births
2006 deaths
Japanese writers
People from Gifu
Akutagawa Prize winners
20th-century novelists